Sow was the musical project of Anna Wildsmith, formed in 1989 and based in France. Raymond Watts, Wildsmith's boyfriend, was also heavily involved in the production of Sow releases. Wildsmith appeared on numerous Pig albums, writing lyrics or performing vocals, such as the song "Cry Baby" from Genuine American Monster. Sow opened for Pigface during their Red Neck, White Trash And Blue Movie Tour in 1998, with Anna Wildsmith also taking the stage for part of the Pigface set. Sow released three albums before Wildsmith’s death from an undisclosed illness on 30 September 2016.

Style
Most tracks are primarily spoken word, alternating between English and French languages, supported by experimental electronic, ambient or industrial soundscapes.

Scene
Among the artists who have contributed to Sow releases are members of KMFDM, Pig, Foetus and Euphonic. Sow's releases were published on Invisible Records, Blue Noise, I, Absentee, Yellow Ltd., and Hyperium Records. Anna Wildsmith has performed vocals on songs for Pig, H3llb3nt, 2-Kut, and Sabbat.

Discography

Major releases
 Je M'Aime (1994)
 Sick (1998)
 Dog (16 March 2010)

Minor releases
 Manripe (1989)

Other appearances of tracks by Sow
 "The Rock" on Project 91
 "Wedge (Pig Remix)" on Dr. Speedlove Presents: Chemical Warfare (Mix Mix Bang Bang)
 "No Candy" and "My House" on The Sick City - Volume One

References

Spoken word
British industrial music groups